= Ditty (musician) =

Indian Singer-Songwriter & Ecologist

Aditi Veena who goes by her stage name Ditty is an Indian singer-songwriter and ecologist. She is known for her style of music creation that correlates the theme of nature in her songs. Ditty published her debut album, Poetry Ceylon, in 2019, followed by a sophomore EP, Skins, in February 2024.
